Yuvaraju is a 1982 Telugu-language drama film, produced by Venkat Akkineni, Nagarjuna Akkineni on Annapurna Studios banner and directed by Dasari Narayana Rao. Starring Akkineni Nageswara Rao, Jayasudha, Sujatha and music composed by Chakravarthy.

Plot 
Rajesh (Akkineni Nageswara Rao) a millionaire, enjoys life in the frolic. Dr. Karuna (Sujatha) gets acquainted with Rajesh and silently loves him even knowing that he is a vagabond as per his ideologies. Once Rajesh goes to their estate where he saves a beautiful, innocent and charming girl named Aasha (Jayasudha) from the hands of goons. Actually, Aasha is an amnesiac patient who can not recall her past. Rajesh could not gaze it and starts loving her imagining as his dream girl. One night they get sexually interacted. After that, Rajesh moves to the city along with Aasha where she misguides him showing an unknown person Puli Papa Rao (Allu Ramalingaiah) as her father. Believing it, Rajesh sends his father Ranga Subba Rao (Prabhakar Reddy)  to fix up the alliance with Puli Papa Rao's daughter who is Dr. Karuna. Here, the wheel of fortune makes Ranga Subba Rao & Puli Papa Rao are good old friends and they happily agree. During the time of marriage, Rajesh is shocked to see Karuna and reveals the entire story, so, she calls off the wedding with a broken heart. Now Rajesh moves in search of to Aasha, by the time, she regains her memory, who is actually Jyothi and returns to her home. At that juncture, Rajesh tries to retrieve the time spent with him but fails. Meanwhile, her brother Ramakrishna (Sridhar) decides to couple up her with a guy Murali (Murali Mohan). Being cognizant of it, depressed Rajesh becomes a drunkard, during that plight, Karuna nurses him back to health when he too realizes her love and decides to marry her. At that point in time, unfortunately, Aasha / Jyothi returns regaining her memories with Rajesh and also finds herself as pregnant. Heretofore, Rajesh performs espousal with Karuna, so, Aasha / Jyothi decides to sacrifice her love but Karuna is already to do so. But, Rajesh cannot accept either of them suffers from pain and wants both their love, they too are willing but hesitates due to the fear of violating the norms of civilized society. Rajesh convinces them not to forego their happiness due to cowardice and to face society with courage. Finally, the movie ends on a happy note by all of them are living under one roof.

Cast
Akkineni Nageswara Rao as Rajesh
Jayasudha as Aasha / Jyothi 
Sujatha as Dr. Karuna
Prabhakar Reddy as Ranga Subba Rao
Allu Ramalingaiah as Puli Papa Rao
Padmanabham as Driver
Murali Mohan as Mohan
Sridhar as Ramakrishna
Pushpalata as Rajesh's mother
Mamatha as Musalamma
K. Vijaya as Vijaya
Dubbing Janaki as Doctor

Soundtrack

Music composed by Chakravarthy. Lyrics were written by Dasari Narayana Rao. Music released on SEA Records Audio Company.

Others
 VCDs and DVDs on - VOLGA Videos, Hyderabad

References

1982 films
1980s Telugu-language films
Indian drama films
Films directed by Dasari Narayana Rao
Films scored by K. Chakravarthy
1982 drama films